Tritonicula myrakeenae is a species of dendronotid nudibranch. It is a marine gastropod mollusc in the family Tritoniidae. A number of species of Tritonia were moved to a new genus Tritonicula in  2020 as a result of an integrative taxonomic study of the family Tritoniidae.

Distribution
This species is reported from California, USA and Baja California, Mexico to Costa Rica. The type locality is Southeast end of Isla Cedros, Baja California, Mexico, rocky reef west of lighthouse, in Bahía Sudeste, .

References

Tritoniidae
Gastropods described in 1986